The Charlotte County Court House is a former court house located in St. Andrews, New Brunswick, Canada. It served as the local seat of the Court of Queen's Bench of New Brunswick. It was the oldest court house in Canada still in continuous use until 2016, when court cases stopped being heard in St. Andrews.

History
The court house was constructed in 1840 adjacent to the Charlotte County Gaol, and was designed by architect Thomas Berry.  The building features a pedimented portico, onto which a large Royal coat of arms was added in 1858 by Charles Kennedy.  In its early years, the building was a focal point for local activities such as elections, fairs, parades, and official visits.

National Historic Site
The building was designated a National Historic Site of Canada in 1981, as the best preserved example in New Brunswick of the typical mid-19th century Maritime courthouse.  It was subsequently also designated under the provincial Historic Sites Protection Act in 1997.

See also
Charlotte County Archives

References

Courthouses in Canada
National Historic Sites in New Brunswick
Buildings and structures in Charlotte County, New Brunswick
Canadian Register of Historic Places in New Brunswick
Government buildings completed in 1840
Neoclassical architecture in Canada
1840 establishments in New Brunswick
Saint Andrews, New Brunswick